A conch is a kind of large sea snail, especially those in the family Strombidae. Conch may also refer to:

Places
 Conch Key in Florida 
 Conch Republic, Key West, Florida micronation

People
 Conch (people) of Bahamas and Florida

Architecture
 Conch (architecture), semicircular apse or its domed roof
 Conch house, a style of architecture found in Key West and Miami, Florida

Art, entertainment, and media
 "Conch", Patti Smith poem in kodak (book)
 The Conch, an album by the band moe

Musical instruments
 Conch (instrument), a musical instrument made from a seashell
 Horagai, a shell used as a musical instrument in Japan

Other uses
 Conch (SSH), secure-shell software written in python 
 Anhui Conch Cement Company, Chinese business
 Conch awards for audio production
 Conch piercing, modification of human ear 
 Shankha, a shell used as a ritual object in Hinduism

See also
 Conche (disambiguation)
 Conk, an African-American hairstyle